State Correctional Institution – Albion is a Medium-Security correctional facility for males, located in the extreme northwestern corner of the commonwealth of Pennsylvania in Erie County. SCI-Albion also holds Close-Security inmates as well.

History
SCI Albion was a prototype of four other similar correctional facilities constructed in the 1990s. Funding for construction was unique at the time as the Department of General Services joined Erie County to construct this facility. The county had a prison authority to float the bond Issues and authorize payments. The Commonwealth pays for the indebtedness via a monthly payment to the county.

Facility 
SCI Albion covers a 357-acre area, with 67 of those acres within the perimeter fence.  The grounds also include 22 structures, including the prison's ten (10) housing units. Housing consists of both cells and dormitory-style housing. A Special Needs Unit (SNU) and Residential Treatment Unit (RTU) at SCI Albion are present.

Capacity/demographics
As of April 30, 2022, 1,999 males were incarcerated at SCI-Albion, within a stated capacity of 2,191. The institution employs 533.

Inmate support

Education
 Through GED Level
 Vocational education courses in Business Practices, Computer Technology, Custodial Maintenance, Warehouse/Material Handling, Environment

Inmate support groups
Family/relationship self
Sex offenders 
Alcohol and other drug (AOD)
Offense-related
Mental health 
RTU (Residential Treatment Unit) Groups
(Five others)

Other programs
 Virtual Visitation
 Correctional Industries - Commissary Distribution Center, which processes, packs and ships food orders to other prisons and employs 90 inmates
 Community Work Program -  Inmates contributed 6,783 hours of community work in 2012 for an estimated savings to the community of $169,575.

See also
 List of Pennsylvania state prisons

References

External links
 Penna. Department of Corrections - SCI Albion

Prisons in Pennsylvania
Buildings and structures in Erie County, Pennsylvania
1993 establishments in Pennsylvania